The 2000 Calgary Stampeders season was the 44th season for the team in the Canadian Football League and their 63rd overall. The Stampeders finished in 1st place in the West Division with a 12–5–1 record. They appeared in the West Final but they lost to the BC Lions.

Preseason

Regular season

Season standings

Season schedule

Playoffs

West Final

Awards and records

2000 CFL All-Stars
QB – Dave Dickenson
WR – Travis Moore
DT – Joe Fleming
DE – Shonte Peoples
LB – Alondra Johnson
CB – Marvin Coleman
DB – Eddie Davis
DS – Greg Frers

References

Calgary Stampeders seasons
Calgary Stampeders Season, 2000
2000 in Alberta